43rd Regiment or 43rd Infantry Regiment may refer to:

 43rd Erinpura Regiment, a unit of the British Indian Army
 43rd Infantry Regiment (France), a unit of the French Army
 43rd Infantry Regiment (Philippine Commonwealth Army), a unit of the Philippine Commonwealth Army 
 43rd (Monmouthshire) Regiment of Foot, a unit of the United Kingdom Army 
 43rd Royal Tank Regiment, a armoured unit of the United Kingdom Army 
 43rd Infantry Regiment (United States), a unit of the United States Army 
 43rd Air Defense Artillery Regiment, a unit of the United States Army 
 43rd Bomber Aviation Regiment, a aviation unit of the Yugoslav Air Force

 American Civil War regiments
 43rd Illinois Volunteer Infantry Regiment, a unit of the Union (North) Army 
 43rd Wisconsin Volunteer Infantry Regiment, a unit of the Union (North) Army 
 43rd New York Volunteer Infantry Regiment, a unit of the Union (North) Army 
 43rd Regiment Massachusetts Volunteer Infantry, a unit of the Union (North) Army 
 43rd Indiana Infantry Regiment, a unit of the Union (North) Army 
 43rd Ohio Infantry, a unit of the Union (North) Army 
 43rd United States Colored Infantry, a unit of the Union (North) Army 
 43rd Georgia Volunteer Infantry, a unit of the Confederate Army
 43rd North Carolina Infantry, a unit of the Confederate Army
 43rd Mississippi Infantry, a unit of the Confederate Army

See also
 43rd Division (disambiguation)
 43rd Group (disambiguation)
 43rd Brigade (disambiguation)
 43rd Battalion (disambiguation)
 43rd Squadron (disambiguation)